Lindevang station is a rapid transit station on the Copenhagen Metro in Frederiksberg, Denmark. It serves the M1 and M2 lines. It is located where the Metro line crosses Dalgas Boulevard in Frederiksberg. It opened 12 October 2003. It is located in fare zone 2.

History 
Lindevang station operated from 13 December 1986 to 1 January 2000 as a stop on the Copenhagen S-train line between Vanløse and Frederiksberg. The line was subsequently converted to a part of the Metro network.

Cultural references
Lindevang St. is a 2014 song by Mouritz/Hørslev Projektet

References

External links
Lindevang station on www.m.dk 
Lindevang station on www.m.dk 

M1 (Copenhagen Metro) stations
M2 (Copenhagen Metro) stations
Railway stations opened in 2003
Railway stations in Denmark opened in the 21st century